Tales of Pirx the Pilot is a science fiction stories collection by Polish author Stanisław Lem, about a spaceship pilot named Pirx.

The first collection of stories about Pirx was published in 1965 in the Soviet Union in Russian under the title Охота на Сэтавра ("The Hunt for Setaur").  It was translated in Latvian  as Petaura medības in 1966. In 2009 a Lithuanian publisher Eridanas published the story as Setauro Medžioklė. In Poland a more complete collection (as Opowieści o pilocie Pirxie) was published in 1968, and translated to English in two parts (Tales of Pirx the Pilot and More Tales of Pirx the Pilot) in 1979 and 1982.  Pirx stories include both philosophical and comic elements. A fragment of "The Hunt for Setaur" was added to the required curriculum for Polish junior-high school students in the 1990s.

Pirx universe 
From various details it may be concluded that the stories are set in the 21st or 22nd centuries, in a futuristic Western world (as opposed to a Communist Utopia where some of Lem's other novels take place), however without the "Iron Curtain".  "The romantic times of astronautics have long gone" and mankind is busy colonizing the Solar System, has some settlements on the Moon and Mars, and is even beginning the exploration of the other star systems.

Pirx is a cadet, a pilot, and finally a captain of a merchant spaceship, and the stories relate his life and various things that happen to him during his travels between the Earth, Moon, and Mars.

Pirx 

In a way, Pirx is as an ordinary "working man" who unlike traditional heroic space pilots has little if anything heroic about him. He sometimes finds himself in extreme situations, which he overcomes mostly through ordinary common sense and average luck. In particular, in the story The Inquest, Lem puts forth the idea that what is perceived a human weakness is in fact an advantage over a perfect machine. In this tale Pirx defeats the robot, because a human can hesitate, make wrong decisions, have doubts, but a robot cannot.

Stories 
Tales of Pirx the Pilot was translated by Louis Iribarne. More Tales of Pirx the Pilot was also translated by Iribarne, with the assistance of Magdalena Majcherczyk. An exception is "The Hunt", translated by Michael Kandel.

Tales of Pirx the Pilot
 "The Test"
 "The Conditioned Reflex"
 "On Patrol"
 "The Albatross"
 "Terminus"

More Tales of Pirx the Pilot
 "The Hunt"
 "Pirx's Tale"
 "The Accident"
 "The Inquest"; for plot summary, see  Inquest of Pilot Pirx, a 1978 film
 "Ananke"

The Hunt for Setaur 

Russian title -> Latvian title - English title (Polish title)
Испытание -> Pārbaudījums -  "The Test" (Test)
Условный рефлекс -> Nosacītais reflekss - "The Conditioned Reflex" (Odruch warunkowy)
Патруль -> Patruļa - "On Patrol" (Patrol )
Альбатрос  -> «Albatross» - "The Albatross" (Albatros)
Терминус  -> Terminuss -  "Terminus" (Terminus )
Охота на Сэтавра -> Petaura medības - "The Hunt" (Polowanie )
The hunted is runaway robot Setaur =  Samoprogramujcy Elektronowy Trojkowy Automat Racemiczny = Selfprogramming Electronic Ternary Automaton with Racemic memory = Самопрограммирующийся электронный троичный автомат с рацемической памятью

Adaptations 

A television mini-series, Pirx kalandjai (The Adventures of Pirx), was released in Hungary in 1973. A Polish-Soviet feature-length film, Inquest of Pilot Pirx, was released in 1979.

Reception
Dave Langford reviewed More Tales of Pirx the Pilot for White Dwarf #42, and stated that "The perfect thinking machine is never perfect because it's been built by fallible us. 'A robot that can match man mentally and not be capable of lying or cheating is a fantasy.' So much for Asimov's Three Laws of Robotics!"

Reviews
Review by Bob Mecoy (1980) in Future Life, May 1980
Review by Ian Watson (1981) in Foundation, #21 February 1981
Review by George Zebrowski (1981) in The Magazine of Fantasy & Science Fiction, April 1981
Review by Bruce Gillespie (1981) in SF Commentary, #62/63/64/65/66
Review by David Langford [as by Dave Langford] (1981) in Paperback Inferno, Volume 5, Number 2
Review by Bob Mecoy (1982) in Heavy Metal, August 1982
Review by Norman Beswick (1991) in Paperback Inferno, #88

See also
The Hunt (1950s Stanisław Lem short story), a precursor of The Hunt of Pirx's tales.

References

External links 
Tales of Pirx the Pilot at the official Lem website  (English version)
  - Polish-USSR movie adaptation.
review by Jason Weisberger at boing boing
A review at The New York Times

1979 short story collections
Hard science fiction
Short story collections by Stanisław Lem
Polish short story collections